The Mascarene crow (Euploea euphon) is a species of Nymphalidae butterfly in the Danainae subfamily. It is found in Mauritius and Réunion.

The larvae feed on Ficus repens and Nerium oleander.

Sources

References

Seitz, A. Die Gross-Schmetterlinge der Erde 13: Die Afrikanischen Tagfalter. Plate XIII 23 c

Butterflies described in 1844
Euploea
Taxonomy articles created by Polbot